Rise, Inc. is an American non-governmental civil rights organization working with multiple state legislatures and the U.S. Congress to implement a sexual assault survivors' bill of rights.  Its founder and president is Amanda Nguyen.

In October 2016, the Sexual Assault Survivors' Rights Act was enacted in the United States.

History

In November 2014, Nguyen founded Rise, a nonprofit organisation which is aimed to protect the civil rights of sexual assault and rape survivors. In 2013, she had been raped while attending college in Massachusetts. Nguyen headed the organisation in her spare time until September 2016. Everyone who works with Rise is a volunteer, and the organisation has raised money through GoFundMe. Nguyen explained that the organisation was named Rise to "remind us that a small group of thoughtful, committed citizens can rise up and change the world."

See also
 Post-assault treatment of sexual assault victims

References

External links
 
 

Sexual abuse advocacy and support groups
Civil rights organizations in the United States
Victims' rights